Bilifang Nazary  is an Indian footballer who plays as a goalkeeper for ONGC F.C. in the I-League.

Career

Early career
Nazary used to play for Mohun Bagan before joining the Sports Authority of India team. While with the Sports Authority of India, Nazary was loaned out to ONGC. While with ONGC Nazary helped the club to promotion to the I-League during the 2010 I-League 2nd Division. He then became ONGC's #1 keeper during the 2010–11 I-League which ended in heart-brake as the club was relegated.

ONGC full-time
On 2 August 2012 it was announced that Nazary had signed a permanent deal with ONGC F.C. for the 2012-13 I-League.

Career statistics

Club
Statistics accurate as of 11 May 2013

References

Indian footballers
Living people
I-League players
ONGC FC players
1987 births
Footballers from Assam
Association football goalkeepers